Mighty Times: The Children's March is a 2004 American short documentary film about the Birmingham, Alabama civil rights marches in the 1960s, highlighting the bravery of young activists involved in the Children's Crusade. It was directed by Robert Houston and produced by Robert Hudson. In 2005, the film won an Oscar at the 77th Academy Awards for Documentary Short Subject. The film was co-produced by the Southern Poverty Law Center and HBO.

Cast
 Dominiqua Alexis as Interviewed Protester (as Dominiqua Lint)
 Rico E. Anderson as D.J. Shelley "The Playboy" Stewart
 Josh Evans as Police Interrogator / Firefighter
 Kali Hawk as Lenore, Protester on the news
 Jessica Joy Kemock as Townsperson
 Tony Otto as Birmingham Police Officer
 Jeremy Rodriguez as Joe
 Rick Sharp as Jail Interrogator reenactment
 Stephen Keber as Bull Connor

See also
 Civil rights movement in popular culture
 Birmingham campaign

References

External links

Mighty Times: The Children's March at Teaching Tolerance

2004 films
2004 short documentary films
2004 independent films
American short documentary films
American independent films
Best Documentary Short Subject Academy Award winners
Documentary films about the civil rights movement
Films scored by Don Davis (composer)
Films directed by Robert Houston
Films set in Alabama
Southern Poverty Law Center
Documentary films about Alabama
2000s English-language films
2000s American films